The Termotasajero II is a 161.6-megawatt (net) coal-fired power plant in San Cayetano, Cúcuta, Norte de Santander, Colombia.

Termotasajero II Coal Thermal Power Generation Plant Project in Colombia successfully completed synchronization on November 2, 2015.

Conducted as a preparation to full-scale commercial operation, synchronization is a series of processes to link the power generated on the field to the power grid in order to supply it to households and industrial fields. TT2 Project will be fully up and running after several phases of trial operation including an increased output test and a performance guarantee test designed to ensure safety and reliability.

The plant damage, February 2, 2016   follows a month-long outage at the recently inaugurated TermoTasajero 2 coal-fired unit. The 160MW plant came back on line on 15 March 2016, after six out of 18 transformers were damaged during maintenance

See also

List of power stations in Colombia

References

External links
Termotasajero S.A E.S.P Homepage

Power stations in Colombia
Coal-fired power stations in South America